This is a list of prominent past wrestlers (either retired or deceased) in the sport of professional sumo. They are listed in order of the year and tournament month that they made their professional debuts. The information listed below was gleaned from the wrestlers' individual articles; refer to their links for more details.

List
{| class="sortable wikitable" style="font-size: 100%"
|-
!Shikona|Ring name
!Entered
!Retired
!width="80" |Highest rank
!Stable
!class="unsortable"|Career and other notes
|-
|Akashi Shiganosuke
|1624?
|1643?
|aYokozuna
|N.A.
|yokozuna status conferred centuries later, historical existence disputed
|-
|Ayagawa Gorōji
|1715?
|1745?
|aYokozuna
|N.A.
|yokozuna status historically conferred, actual yokozuna license never proven
|-
|Maruyama Gondazaemon
|1735?
|1749-11
|aYokozuna
|Nanatsumori
|yokozuna status historically conferred, died while an active wrestler
|-
|Miyagino Nishikinosuke
|1766-10
|1796-3
|cSekiwake
|Sanoyama
|oldest top division wrestler at the age of 52, first Miyagino stablemaster
|-
|Tanikaze Kajinosuke
|1769-4
|1794-11
||aYokozuna
|Isenoumi
|streak of 63 wins held for 150 years, died while active
|-
|Onogawa Kisaburō
|1779-10
|1798-10
|aYokozuna
|Tamagaki
|first yokozuna to perform dohyo-iri along with Tanikaze
|-
|Raiden Tameemon
|1790-11
|1811-2
|bŌzeki
|Urakaze  (Isenoumi)
|considered one of the best wrestlers ever, but never promoted to yokozuna, likely for political reasons
|-
|Kashiwado Risuke
|1806-10
|1825-1
|bŌzeki
|Isenoumi
|rejected a yokozuna license to avoid conflict between prominent families
|-
|Tamagaki Gakunosuke
|1806-10
|1824-8
|bŌzeki
|Tamagaki
|like Kashiwado, a yokozuna strength wrestler who had to reject a license
|-
|onomatsumŌnomatsu Midorinosuke
|1815-3
|1835-11
|aYokozuna
|Takekuma
|was often criticized for number of false starts
|-
|Inazuma
|1821-2
|1839-11
|aYokozuna
|Sadogatake
|received yokozuna licenses from Gojo family and Yoshida family
|-
|Tsurugizan Taniemon
|1827-3
|1852-2
|bŌzeki
|Onomatsu
|offered a yokozuna license but rejected it
|-
|Hidenoyama Raigorō
|1828-3
|1850-3
|aYokozuna
|Hidenoyama
|shortest yokozuna ever, wrestlers outside his stable once staged a strike against his authority
|-
|Shiranui Dakuemon
|1830-11
|1844-1
|aYokozuna
|Urakaze
|coach of Shiranui Kōemon
|-
|Unryū Kyūkichi
|1847-11
|1865-2
|aYokozuna
|Oitekaze
|unryū dohyō-iri style named for him
|-
|Jinmaku
|1850-11
|1867-11
|aYokozuna
|Hidenoyama
|erected monument to former yokozuna, first time first 3 yokozuna recognized
|-
|Shiranui Kōemon
|1850-11
|1869-11
|aYokozuna
|Sakaigawa
|considered the actual innovator of the unryū dohyō-iri style
|-
|Kimenzan Tanigorō
|1852-2
|1870-11
|aYokozuna
|Takekuma
|at 43 oldest wrestler ever to be promoted to yokozuna
|-
|Sakaigawa Namiemon
|1857-11
|1881-1
|aYokozuna
|Sakaigawa
|a number of dubious yokozuna titles were awarded in his period, diluting the integrity of the title, his title is the only one from his time still recognized
|-
|Umegatani I
|1871-3
|1885-5
|aYokozuna
|Ikazuchi
|died at 83, longest-lived yokozuna after retirement, helped build first Ryōgoku Kokugikan
|-
|Nishinoumi Kajirō I
|1882-1
|1896-1
|aYokozuna
|Takasago
|first wrestler actually listed on banzuke at the rank of yokozuna
|-
|Konishiki Yasokichi I
|1883-5
|1901-1
|aYokozuna
|Takasago
|although competitive, never won a championship as yokozuna
|-
|ozutsumŌzutsu Man'emon
|1885-1
|1908-1
|aYokozuna
|Oguruma
|strength greatly declined after fighting in Russo-Japanese War
|-
|Onigatani Saiji
|1886-1
|1907-1
|dKomusubi
|Ikazuchi
|retired from active sumo at age of 51
|-
|Wakashima
|1891-5
|1907-1
|aYokozuna
|Tomozuna Nakamura
|first official yokozuna from Osaka sumo, retired young due to a cycling accident
|-
|Hitachiyama
|1892-6
|1914-5
|aYokozuna
|Dewanoumi
|last wrestler to win over .900 of his bouts in top division, considered to be the most honorable yokozuna ever by many, did much to increase the popularity of sumo
|-
|Umegatani II
|1892-6
|1915-5
|aYokozuna
|Ikazuchi
|youngest ever yokozuna at that time
|-
|Araiwa Kamenosuke
|1894-1
|1909-1
|bŌzeki
|Oguruma
|had a winning average of over .800 
|-
|Takamiyama Torinosuke
|1895-6
|1913-5
|cSekiwake
|Takasago
|won first officially recognized sumo top division championship
|-
|Tamatsubaki Kentaro
|1897-1
|1916-1
|cSekiwake
|Ikazuchi
|at 158 cm, the shortest wrestler in history
|-
|onishikidŌnishiki Daigorō
|1898-11
|1922-1
|aYokozuna
|Asahiyama
|active in Osaka sumo
|-
|okidoŌkido Moriemon
|1899-9
|1914-1
|aYokozuna
|Minato
|only yokozuna who spent his whole career in Osaka sumo
|-
|Nishinoumi Kajirō II
|1900-1
|1918-5
|aYokozuna
|Izutsu
|oldest wrestler to be promoted to yokozuna in the 20th century, committed suicide later in life
|-
|Tachiyama
|1900-5
|1918-1
|aYokozuna
|Tomozuna
|never had a losing tournament in 18-year career, only lost 3 bouts as a yokozuna
|-
|otoritŌtori Tanigorō
|1903-5
|1920-5
|aYokozuna
|Miyagino
|has a monument built for him in Inzai, Chiba
|-
|Ryōgoku Yūjirō
|1909-6
|1924-1
|cSekiwake
|Dewanoumi
|only wrestler to win the top division on his first attempt since the 1909 yusho system was established
|-
|onishikiuŌnishiki Uichirō
|1910-1
|1923-1
|aYokozuna
|Dewanoumi
|reached yokozuna after only 5 top division tournaments which is an all-time record, trained under Hitachiyama
|-
|Nishinoumi Kajirō III
|1910-1
|1928-10
|aYokozuna
|Izutsu
|promoted to yokozuna without winning any championships, which caused controversy
|-
|Tsunenohana
|1910-1
|1930-10
|aYokozuna
|Dewanoumi
|attempted suicide as a sumo elder after being blamed for JSA troubles
|-
|Miyagiyama
|1910-6
|1931-1
|aYokozuna
|Takadagawa
|achieved fame in Osaka, helped save integrity of much maligned Osaka sumo by achieving success in Tokyo after Osaka sumo was disbanded
|-
|Tochigiyama
|1911-2
|1925-5
|aYokozuna
|Dewanoumi
|lost only 3 bouts in rise to top division, ended the 56-victory streak of Tachiyama
|-
|Toyokuni Fukuma
|1915-1
|1930-10
|bŌzeki
|Izutsu
|only had two losing tournaments in his rise to ōzeki, had two makunouchi championships
|-
|Shimizugawa
|1917-1
|1937-5
|bŌzeki
|Hatachiyama
|won three top division championships, but never promoted to yokozuna
|-
|Hitachiiwa Eitarō
|1917-5
|1931-3
|bŌzeki
|Dewanoumi
|his only tournament championship caused great controversy
|-
|Tamanishiki
|1919-1
|1938-12
|aYokozuna
|Nishonoseki
|one of very few top division wrestlers who did not walk out in a strike, later brought great success to Nishonoseki stable as head
|-
|Tenryū Saburō
|1920-1
|1931-10
|cSekiwake
|Dewanoumi
|also an accomplished scholar, after being expelled as a leader of the Shunjuen Incident started an independent Ōsaka sumo group, and later became a pioneer in Aikido
|-
|Kagamiiwa Zenshirō
|1922-5
|1939-5
|bŌzeki
|Kumegawa
|discovered and mentored future yokozuna Kagamisato
|-
|Minanogawa Tōzō
|1924-1
|1942-1
|aYokozuna
|TakasagoSadogatake
|popular with public but won no championships at yokozuna rank
|-
|Dewanohana I
|1925-1
|1940-7
|eMaegashira 1
|Dewanoumi
|went on to become chairman of the Japan Sumo Association from 1968-1974
|-
|Musashiyama Takeshi
|1926-1
|1939-5
|aYokozuna
|Dewanoumi
|promotion considered controversial by some, had only one kachi-koshi at yokozuna rank
|-
|Futabayama
|1927-3
|1945-11
|aYokozuna
|Tatsunami
|won 69 consecutive bouts, the longest run in the history of sumo, after retirement admitted was blind in one eye
|-
|Dewaminato I
|1928-3
|1944-11
|cSekiwake
|Dewanoumi
|took the championship in the same tournament Futabayama's winning streak was ended
|-
|Maedayama
|1929-1
|1949-10
|aYokozuna
|Takasago
|former head of Takasago stable
|-
|Akinoumi Setsuo
|1932-2
|1946-11
|aYokozuna
|Dewanoumi
|ended the 69-bout win streak of Futabayama
|-
|Nayoroiwa
|1932-5
|1954-10
|bŌzeki
|Tatsunami
|stablemate of Futabayama, fought until age forty, established Kasugayama stable after retirement
|-
|Haguroyama
|1934-1
|1953-9
|aYokozuna
|Tatsunami
|longest serving yokozuna in history until surpassed by Hakuhō in 2019
|-
|Saganohana
|1934-5
|1952-1
|bŌzeki
|Kumegawa→Nishonoseki
|defeated four yokozuna in one tournament, coached Taihō, among other sumo greats
|-
|Terukuni
|1935-1
|1953-1
|aYokozuna
|Isegahama
|youngest yokozuna ever until Taihō
|-
|Masuiyama Daishirō I
|1935-1
|1950-1
|bŌzeki
|Dewanoumi
|father of ozeki Masuiyama Daishiro II, coach of Kitanoumi
|-
|Azumafuji Kin'ichi
|1936-1
|1954-9
|aYokozuna
|Takasago
|first yokozuna to turn to pro-wrestling after retiring
|-
|Bishūyama
|1936-1
|1955-3
|cSekiwake
|Isegahama, Araiso
|winner of the 1945 Summer tournament cut short due to Allied bombings
|-
|Mitsuneyama
|1937-5
|1960-1
|bŌzeki
|Takashima
|later head coach of Takashima stable
|-
|Tamanoumi Daitaro
|1937-5
|1961-1
|cSekiwake
|Nishonoseki
|first wrestler to wear a brightly colored mawashi, flouting JSA rules and won first championship with 15-0 record while wearing it, had 9 gold stars in career
|-
|Kotonishiki Noboru
|1938-1
|1955-5
|dKomusubi
|Nishonoseki
|founder of Sadogatake stable, trained yokozuna Kotozakura
|-
|Toyonishiki
|1938-1
|1945-11
|fMaegashira 17
|Dewanoumi
|first Japanese-American to reach the top division
|-
|Yoshibayama
|1938-5
|1958-1
|aYokozuna
|Takashima
|though successful, he overall ability was hindered by injuries from World War II before he entered sumo
|-
|Tochinishiki
|1939-1
|1960-5
|aYokozuna
|Kasugano
|known for small size and his tenacity, once fought back from seven straight losses to win his kachi-koshi
|-
|Kitanonada
|1940-1
|1962-3
|cSekiwake
|Tatsunami
| won ten career kinboshi, retired at age 39
|-
|Rikidōzan
|1940-5
|1950-9
|cSekiwake
|Nishonoseki
|after retiring, moved on to become "the father of pro-wrestling in Japan"
|-
|-
|Tokitsuyama
|1940-5
|1961-3
|cSekiwake
|Tatsunami
|makuuchi champion, known for using a variety of rare techniques
|-
|Kagamisato
|1941-1
|1958-1
|aYokozuna
|Tokitsukaze
|died at age 80, one of the longest-lived former yokozuna
|-
|Matsunobori
|1941-1
|1961-11
|bŌzeki
|Oyama
|head of small Oyama stable after retirement
|-
|Chiyonoyama
|1942-1
|1959-1
|aYokozuna
|Dewanoumi
|founded Kokonoe stable
|-
|Dewanishiki
|1942-1
|1956-11
|cSekiwake
|Dewanoumi
|had 10 gold stars, held komusubi rank 9 times before reaching sekiwake
|-
|Wakabayama
|1942-1
|1961-1
|dKomusubi
|Tokitsukaze
|earned four gold stars, three grandsons all became rikishi
|-
|ouchiyamaŌuchiyama
|1944-1
|1959-3
|bŌzeki
|Tokitsukaze
|one of the tallest wrestlers ever at 202 cm
|-
|Kotogahama
|1945-11
|1962-11
|bŌzeki
|Nishonoseki
|five times a top division tournament runner-up, turned down opportunity to run Sadogatake stable
|-
|Wakanohana
|1946-11
|1962-5
|aYokozuna
|NishonosekiShibatayamaHanakago
|former head of JSA, one of lightest yokozuna, older brother of Takanohana Kenshi
|-
|Toyonobori
|1947-6
|1954-9
|e1Maegashira 15
|Izutsu
|went on to become a well-known professional wrestler
|-
|Tsurugamine
|1947-6
|1967-7
|cSekiwake
|Tomozuna
|holds record for most technique prizes at 10, had ten gold stars
|-
|Asashio III
|1948-10
|1962-1
|aYokozuna
|Takasago
|former head of Takasago stable
|-
|Wakahaguro
|1949-10
|1965-3
|bŌzeki
|Tatsunami
|died of stroke after retiring at age 34
|-
|Annenyama
|1950-1
|1965-3
|cSekiwake
|Tatsunami
|former head of Tatsunami stable, earned 10 gold stars
|-
|Fusanishiki
|1952-1
|1967-1
|cSekiwake
|WakamatsuNishiiwaWakamatsu
|former head coach of Wakamatsu stable 1979-1990
|-
|Oikawa
|1952-1
|1962-5
|fMaegashira 10
|OnoeTakasago
|two-time jūryō champion
|-
|Tochihikari
|1952-5
|1966-1
|bŌzeki
|Kasugano
|member of Kasugano stable, an ōzeki for 22 tournaments
|-
|Iwakaze
|1952-5
|1965-9
|cSekiwake
|WakamatsuNishiiwaWakamatsu
|jūryō champion
|-
|Wakakoma
|1952-5
|1962-3
|eMaegashira 8
|NishonosekiShibatayamaHanakago
|jūryō champion
|-
|Kanenohana
|1952-5
|1967-9
|dKomusubi
|Dewanoumi
|jūryō champion
|-
|Maedagawa
|1952-9
|1967-5
|cSekiwake
|Takasago
|runner-up in two top division tournaments
|-
|Kiyonomori
|1953-1
|1967-5
|eMaegashira 9
|Isegahama
|two-time jūryō champion, former head coach of Kise stable
|-
|Aonosato
|1953-3
|1969-3
|cSekiwake
|Tokitsukaze
|two-time jūryō champion, former head coach of Tatsutagawa stable 1988-2000
|-
|Fujinishiki
|1953-3
|1968-11
|dKomusubi
|Takasago
|former head of Takasago stable, coached Konishiki, Mitoizumi to top division
|-
|Wakasugiyama
|1953-3
|1967-5
|eMaegashira 1
|NishonosekiShibatayamaHanakago
|jūryō champion
|-
|Wakanokuni
|1953-3
|1969-9
|eMaegashira 8
|ShibatayamaHanakago
|three-time jūryō champion
|-
|Oiteyama
|1953-5
|1969-5
|eMaegashira 6
|OitekazeTatsunami
|jūryō champion
|-
|Kiminishiki
|1953-5
|1968-5
|eMaegashira 3
|Tatsunami
|jūryō champion
|-
|Kitabayama
|1954-5
|1966-5
|bŌzeki
|Tokitsukaze
|held ōzeki rank for 30 tournaments
|-
|Kashiwado
|1954-9
|1969-7
|aYokozuna
|Isenoumi
|former director of JSA, overshadowed by rival Taihō
|-
|Udagawa
|1954-9
|1967-7
|eMaegashira 3
|TakashimaYoshibayamaMiyagino
|jūryō champion
|-
|Myōbudani
|1954-3
|1969-11
|cSekiwake
|Miyagino
|took part in two top division championship playoffs
|-
|Wakachichibu
|1954-5
|1968-11
|cSekiwake
|Hanakago
|two-time jūryō champion, won two special prizes, former elder in the JSA
|-
|Wakamisugi
|1955-3
|1967-5
|cSekiwake
|Hanakago
|won a top division championship from the maegashira ranks
|-
|Wakatenryū
|1955-3
|1969-7
|eMaegashira 1
|Hanakago
|two-time jūryō champion
|-
|Niigiyama
|1955-3
|1963-5
|fMaegashira 11
|Tokitsukaze
|two-time jūryō champion
|-
|Kainoyama
|1955-5
|1970-1
|cSekiwake
|OnogawaDewanoumi
|winner of six special prizes and five gold stars
|-
|Okanoyama
|1955-5
|1965-1
|eMaegashira 5
|Tokitsukaze
|jūryō champion
|-
|Amatsukaze
|1955-5
|1967-5
|eMaegashira 3
|Tokitsukaze
|two-time jūryō champion
|-
|Tochinoumi
|1955-9
|1966-11
|aYokozuna
|Kasugano
|former head of Kasugano stable, one of lightest yokozuna ever
|-
|Hagurohana
|1955-9
|1965-11
|cSekiwake
|Tatsunami
|former elder in the JSA
|-
|Sadanoyama
|1956-1
|1968-3
|aYokozuna
|Dewanoumi
|former head of JSA
|-
|Kairyūyama
|1956-3
|1968-3
|cSekiwake
|AraisoIsegahama
|jūryō champion, won eight gold stars
|-
|Daimonji
|1956-3
|1973-7
|eMaegashira 5
|NakamuraNishonoseki
|jūryō champion, former Nishiiwa-oyakata
|-
|Daiyū
|1956-5
|1972-9
|eMaegashira 1
|Izutsu
|two-time jūryō champion, founder of Kabutoyama stable
|-
|Azumanishiki
|1956-5
|1967-9
|fMaegashira 15
|Takasago
|jūryō champion, one tournament in the top division
|-
|Tensuiyama
|1956-5
|1968-9
|fMaegashira 10
|AraisoIsegahama
|two-time jūryō champion
|-
|Kiyokuni
|1956-9
|1974-1
|bŌzeki
|Isegahama
|former head of Isegahama stable
|-
|Taihō
|1956-9
|1971-5
|aYokozuna
|Nishonoseki
|won 32 championships which stood as record until 2015, at the time was youngest yokozuna ever at 21
|-
|Sawahikari
|1956-9
|1964-11
|dKomusubi
|Tokitsukaze
|jūryō champion
|-
|Tamaarashi
|1956-9
|1967-7
|eMaegashira 4
|NishonosekiKataonami
|two-time jūryō champion
|-
|Kitanofuji
|1957-1
|1974-7
|aYokozuna
|DewanoumiKokonoe
|former head of Kokonoe stable, coached Chiyonofuji and Hokutoumi to yokozuna
|-
|Ryūko
|1957-1
|1975-5
|dKomusubi
|Hanakago
|after retiring, found success as a TV actor
|-
|Wakanami
|1957-3
|1972-3
|dKomusubi
|Tatsunami
|only 103 kg at peak weight
|-
|Kōtetsuyama
|1957-3
|1975-1
|cSekiwake
|Asahiyama
|jūryō champion, founder of Onaruto stable
|-
|Asasegawa
|1957-5
|1971-5
|eMaegashira 1
|AraisoIsegahama
|two-time jūryō champion, former elder in the JSA
|-
|Wakamiyama
|1957-11
|1969-11
|cSekiwake
|Tatsunami
|jūryō champion
|-
|Fukunohana
|1958-1
|1975-11
|cSekiwake
|Dewanoumi
|won seven special prizes and five gold stars
|-
|Daikirin
|1958-5
|1974-11
|bŌzeki
|Nishonoseki
|sumo elder until June 2006
|-
|Hanahikari
|1958-5
|1970-9
|eMaegashira 3
|Hanakago
|jūryō champion, former elder in the JSA 1970-1975
|-
|Katsuhikari
|1958-9
|1973-3
|eMaegashira 1
|AraisoIsegahama
|jūryō champion, former head coach at Isegahama stable
|-
|Tochiōyama
|1958-11
|1972-1
|eMaegashira 1
|Kasugano
|jūryō champion
|-
|Kotozakura
|1959-1
|1974-7
|aYokozuna
|Sadogatake
|was head of Sadogatake stable during a very successful period
|-
|Tamanoumi
|1959-3
|1971-9
|aYokozuna
|Kataonami
|died during surgery while an active yokozuna
|-
|Asaarashi
|1959-3
|1973-3
|fMaegashira 12
|Takasago
|former elder in the JSA under the name Furiwake
|-
|Yoshinohana
|1959-5
|1973-7
|eMaegashira 1
|Dewanoumi
|two-time jūryō champion, former elder in the JSA
|-
|Shiratayama
|1959-7
|1977-7
|eMaegashira 4
|Takasago
|jūryō champion, former elder in the JSA
|-
|Tokibayama
|1959-9
|1975-3
|eMaegashira 2
|Tokitsukaze
|two-time jūryō champion, died while active as an elder in the JSA
|-
|Hasegawa
|1960-3
|1976-5
|cSekiwake
|Sadogatake
|unusually, kept his family name as his ring name, former director of the Nagoya tournament for the JSA
|-
|Arashiyama
|1960-3
|1972-5
|fMaegashira 12
|Miyagino
|jūryō champion
|-
|Toyokuni Susumu
|1960-5
|1968-1
|dKomusubi
|Tokitsukaze
|won seven gold stars
|-
|Futagoryū
|1960-9
|1971-3
|eMaegashira 5
|HanakagoFutagoyama
|jūryō champion
|-
|Wakafutase
|1960-9
|1975-3
|dKomusubi
|OnarutoAsahiyama
|two-time jūryō champion, former head coach of Asahiyama stable
|-
|Tochiazuma I
|1960-11
|1977-1
|cSekiwake
|Kasugano
| won ten special prizes, father of Ōzeki Tochiazuma
|-
|Dairyugawa
|1961-1
|1979-5
|eMaegashira 1
|Mihogaseki
|former elder in the JSA under the name Kiyomigata
|-
|Futagodake
|1961-1
|1976-9
|dKomusubi
|HanakagoFutagoyama
|founder of Araiso stable
|-
|Maenoyama
|1961-3
|1974-3
|bŌzeki
|Takasago
|Korean descent, broke his stable off from Ichimon to become independent
|-
|Yutakayama
|1961-3
|1968-9
|bŌzeki
|Tokitsukaze
|runner-up for top division championship 8 times, former head of Tokitsukaze stable and JSA
|-
|Fujinokawa
|1961-5
|1972-11
|cSekiwake
|Isenoumi
|former head of Isenoumi stable and director of the JSA
|-
|Wakanoumi II
|1961-5
|1978-1
|eMaegashira 2
|Hanakago
|jūryō champion, active as an elder in the JSA for 14 years
|-
|Tochifuji
|1961-5
|1974-9
|eMaegashira 3
|Kasugano
|two-time jūryō champion
|-
|Haguroiwa
|1961-5
|1978-1
|dKomusubi
|Tatsunami
|former elder in the JSA under the name Ikazuchi
|-
|Mutsuarashi
|1961-9
|1976-3
|cSekiwake
|Miyagino
|two-time jūryō champion, won five special prizes
|-
|oshiokŌshio
|1962-1
|1988-1
|dKomusubi
|Tokitsukaze
|all-time record for most bouts ever fought
|-
|Maruyama
|1962-5
|1976-9
|fMaegashira 13
|Tokitsukaze
|jūryō champion
|-
|Fujizakura
|1963-3
|1985-3
|cSekiwake
|Takasago
|former holder of the record for most consecutive professional bouts, now head of Nakamura stable
|-
|Tochiisami
|1963-3
|1979-11
|eMaegashira 7
|Kasugano
|jūryō champion, active as an elder in the JSA under the name Iwatomo
|-
|Asahikuni
|1963-7
|1979-9
|bŌzeki
|Tatsunami
|won 6 technique prizes, broke off to form own stable, Ōshima stable
|-
|Mienoumi
|1963-7
|1980-11
|aYokozuna
|Dewanoumi
|took an all-time record 97 tournaments to reach yokozuna
|-
|Asanobori
|1963-7
|1978-5
|eMaegashira 2
|Asahiyama
|four-time jūryō champion, former elder in the JSA
|-
|Futatsuryū
|1963-9
|1982-11
|dKomusubi
|Tokitsukaze
|former Tokitsukaze stable head, stripped of position and arrested over hazing death scandal
|-
|Tenryū
|1963-12
|1976-9
|eMaegashira 1
|Nishonoseki
|after a dispute with the JSA, went on to be a pro wrestler
|-
|Takamiyama
|1964-3
|1984-5
|cSekiwake
|Takasago
|first foreigner to win top division championship, holds many longevity records, held the gold star record until Akinoshima
|-
|Aobajō
|1964-3
|1986-7
|cSekiwake
|Oshiogawa
|holds record for most consecutive career bouts
|-
|Kurohimeyama
|1964-3
|1982-1
|cSekiwake
|Tatsunami
|won eight special prizes and six gold stars
|-
|Tamakiyama
|1964-5
|1984-3
|dKomusubi
|Kataonami
|not to be confused with the Hawaiian born Takamiyama
|-
|Kongō
|1964-5
|1976-9
|cSekiwake
|Nishonoseki
|now head of Nishonoseki stable
|-
|Wakajishi
|1964-5
|1983-5
|dKomusubi
|Futagoyama
|jūryō champion, former elder in the JSA
|-
|Teruzakura
|1964-5
|1976-1
|eMaegashira 7
|Isegahama
|active as an elder in the JSA under the name Urakaze
|-
|Kitaseumi
|1964-7
|1979-5
|cSekiwake
|DewanoumiKokonoe
|jūryō champion, active as an elder in the JSA under the name Kimigahama
|-
|Yoshioyama
|1965-3
|1976-1
|eMaegashira 2
|Mihogaseki
|jūryō champion
|-
|Daiju
|1965-3
|1977-5
|bŌzeki
|Takashima
|briefly held ōzeki rank, then  head of Asahiyama stable
|-
|Taiga
|1965-3
|1977-5
|eMaegashira 1
|Kimigahama
|two-time jūryō champion
|-
|Takanohana I
|1965-5
|1981-1
|bŌzeki
|Futagoyama
|held ōzeki rank for then record 50 tournaments, father of Yokozuna Takanohana II and Wakanohana III
|-
|Yoshinotani
|1965-5
|1982-5
|eMaegashira 4
|Dewanoumi
|jūryō champion, died as an active oyakata
|-
|Kaiki
|1965-9
|1987-3
|cSekiwake
|Tomozuna
|Now head of Tomozuna stable and on board of JSA
|-
|Kurosegawa
|1966-1
|1984-5
|dKomusubi
|Isegahama
|jūryō champion, active as an elder in the JSA under the name Kiriyama
|-
|Chiyozakura
|1966-3
|1978-5
|eMaegashira 5
|DewanoumiKokonoe
|two-time jūryō champion
|-
|Daigō
|1966-5
|1982-3
|fMaegashira 11
|Hanakago
|jūryō champion, former elder in the JSA
|-
|Kaiketsu
|1966-9
|1979-1
|bŌzeki
|Hanakago
|two-time ōzeki, head of JSA from 2010-12 during the match-fixing scandal
|-
|Banryūyama
|1966-11
|1984-11
|dKomusubi
|Mihogaseki
|persevered most of his career in the unsalaried ranks
|-
|Kitanoumi
|1967-1
|1985-1
|aYokozuna
|Mihogaseki
|youngest yokozuna ever, won 24 tournament titles, former head of Kitanoumi stable
|-
|Masuiyama II
|1967-1
|1981-3
|bŌzeki
|Mihogaseki
|at 31, oldest wrestler promoted to ōzeki until Kotomitsuki in modern era
|-
|Washūyama
|1967-3
|1985-11
|cSekiwake
|Dewanoumi
|small wrestler, popular with tournament crowds, now head of Dewanoumi stable
|-
|Kirinji
|1967-5
|1988-9
|cSekiwake
|Nishonoseki
|fought 84 top division tournaments, won a gold star at age 35
|-
|Tamanofuji
|1967-5
|1981-11
|cSekiwake
|Kataonami
|became head of Kataonami stable
|-
|Kotonofuji
|1967-5
|1982-1
|eMaegashira 5
|Sadogatake
|jūryō champion, former elder in the JSA
|-
|Kotogatake
|1967-11
|1984-3
|eMaegashira 1
|Sadogatake
|jūryō champion, former elder in the JSA
|-
|Daihi
|1968-3
|1983-5
|eMaegashira 2
|Oyama
|briefly head coach of Oyama stable before it was shut down in 1986, since 2011 a coach at Azumazeki stable
|-
|onishikiiŌnishiki
|1968-5
|1988-1
|dKomusubi
|Dewanoumi
|Twenty-year career, now an elder in the JSA
|-
|Takanosato
|1968-7
|1986-1
|aYokozuna
|Futagoyama
|late bloomer who became yokozuna at nearly 31 years old, founded Naruto stable
|-
|Wakanohana II
|1968-7
|1983-1
|aYokozuna
|Futagoyama
|now head of Magaki stable
|-
|Hachiya
|1968–9
|1987–9
|eMaegashira 6
|Kasugano
|lightweight who spent a record 55 tournaments in juryo
|-
|Kurama
|1968-9
|1989-9
|cSekiwake
|Tokitsukaze
|had 21-year career, died young of leukemia
|-
|Taikō
|1968-11
|1980-11
|eMaegashira 8
|Futagoyama
|two-time jūryō champion
|-
|Aobayama
|1968-11
|1982-9
|dKomusubi
|Kise
|jūryō champion, died as an active elder in the JSA under the name Asakayama
|-
|Hidanohana
|1969-3
|1989-3
|eMaegashira 1
|Futagoyama
|jūryō champion, former elder in the JSA 1989-1994
|-
|Kaneshiro
|1969-9
|1987-5
|cSekiwake
|Kasugano
|won three special prizes for fighting spirit
|-
|Wajima
|1970-1
|1981-3
|aYokozuna
|Hanakago
|only former collegiate sumo wrestler promoted to yokozuna, or to keep his family name as his ring name, later became a pro wrestler
|-
|Tamaryū
|1970-3
|1992-1
|dKomusubi
|Kataonami
|very long career, spent 11 years in the lower ranks
|-
|Yutakayama
|1970-3
|1981-5
|dKomusubi
|Tokitsukaze
|former college champion, now head of Minato stable
|-
|Hoshiiwato
|1970-5
|1991-1
|fMaegashira 14
|IzutsuMichinoku
|former head coach of Michinoku stable
|-
|Chiyonofuji
|1970-9
|1991-5
|aYokozuna
|Kokonoe
|tournament wins third only to Hakuhō Shō and Taihō, won more championships than any other yokozuna in his thirties, continued to triumph though older and lighter than most opponents, holds record for most top division bouts won, and most bouts won overall
|-
|Zaōnishiki
|1970-9
|1983-1
|eMaegashira 1
|IsenoumiKagamiyama
|jūryō champion, now a coach at Tokitsukaze stable under the name Nishikijima
|-
|Yamaguchi
|1971-1
|1982-11
|eMaegashira 4
|HanakagoHanaregoma
|jūryō champion
|-
|Shishihō
|1971-1
|1987-5
|eMaegashira 2
|NishonosekiTaihō
|three-time jūryō champion
|-
|Misugiiso
|1971-3
|1986-9
|eMaegashira 2
|HanakagoHanaregoma
|jūryō champion, active as an elder in the JSA under the name Minezaki
|-
|ozutsuŌzutsu
|1971-5
|1992-5
|cSekiwake
|Taiho
|fought second-most consecutive bouts in top division history, earned ten gold stars
|-
|Daitetsu
|1971-7
|1990-9
|dKomusubi
|Nishonoseki
|currently a coach at Nishonoseki stable, under the elder name Minatogawa.
|-
|Kotokaze
|1971-7
|1985-11
|bŌzeki
|Sadogatake
|set up own somewhat successful stable, Oguruma, often a commentator on sumo for NHK
|-
|Kotochitose
|1971-7
|1986-7
|eMaegashira 5
|Sadogatake
|two-time jūryō champion
|-
|Konuma
|1971-7
|1978-11
|eMaegashira 9
|Kagamiyama
|jūryō champion, promising career ruined by broken leg
|-
|Takarakuni
|1971-7
|1986-9
|eMaegashira 2
|IsegahamaKiriyama
|jūryō champion
|-
|Hō'ō
|1971-9
|1990-5
|cSekiwake
|Nishonoseki
|four-time jūryō champion
|-
|Iwashita
|1971-11
|1984-3
|eMaegashira 8
|Tatsunami
|jūryō champion
|-
|Arase
|1972-1
|1981-9
|cSekiwake
|Hanakago
|former college champion, became TV personality after retirement
|-
|Sadanoumi
|1972-3
|1988-7
|dKomusubi
|Dewanoumi
|won five special prizes, former elder in the JSA under the name Tagonoura
|-
|Tochiakagi
|1973-1
|1990-3
|cSekiwake
|Kasugano
|jūryō champion, won eight special prizes and eight gold stars
|-
|Chikubayama
|1973-3
|1989-1
|fMaegashira 13
|Miyagino
|now Hakuhō's coach at Miyagino stable
|-
|Koboyama
|1973-3
|1990-11
|cSekiwake
|Takashima, Kumagatani
|after retirement re-established his old stable
|-
|oyutakaŌyutaka
|1974-1
|1987-1
|dKomusubi
|Tokitsukaze
|spent 9 years in unsalaried ranks, founded Arashio stable in 2002
|-
|Tagaryū
|1974-3
|1991-5
|cSekiwake
|Kagamiyama
|once won a top division championship while a low ranked maegashira facing demotion, has exactly one championship in the top four of six divisions
|-
|onohanaŌnohana
|1974-3
|1990-9
|fMaegashira 13
|Taihō
|two-time jūryō champion, former elder in the JSA
|-
|Tōryū
|1974-3
|1990-1
|cSekiwake
|Mihogaseki
|won two gold stars against Wakanohana II
|-
|Dewanohana II
|1974-3
|1988-1
|cSekiwake
|Dewanoumi
|jūryō champion, won ten special prizes, elder in the JSA under the name Dekiyama
|-
|Masudayama
|1974-3
|1989-7
|cSekiwake
|Kasugano
|jūryō champion, active as an elder in the JSA under the name Chiganoura
|-
|Takanomine
|1974-9
|1991-5
|fMaegashira 12
|KimigahamaIzutsu
|took him 88 tournaments to reach the makuuchi division
|-
|Tochiizumi
|1975-1
|1990-3
|g0Jūryō 3
|Kasugano
|jūryō champion
|-
|Tochimatoi
|1975-1
|1989-3
|fMaegashira 11
|Kasugano
|jūryō champion
|-
|Kirishima
|1975-3
|1996-3
|bŌzeki
|Izutsu
|took 91 tournaments for promotion to ōzeki, an all-time record
|-
|onoumiŌnoumi
|1975-3
|1977-7
|eMaegashira 4
|Hanakago
|retired to become a pro wrestler
|-
|Daijuyama
|1975-3
|1991-5
|cSekiwake
|Futagoyama
|won three Fighting Spirit prizes, now head coach of the Hanakago stable
|-
|Wakashimazu
|1975-3
|1987-7
|bŌzeki
|Futagoyama
|started sumo after high school, which is unusually late; nicknamed "Black Panther" by fans for his good looks and lean figure
|-
|Sasshūnada
|1976-1
|1988-3
|eMaegashira 1
|KimigahamaIzutsu
|jūryō champion, now a coach at Michinoku stable under the name Tatsutayama
|-
|Hokuten'yū
|1976-3
|1990-9
|bŌzeki
|Mihogaseki
|one of the longest serving ōzeki, had storied rivalry with Chiyonfuji; his stable was folded into Kitanoumi stable upon his death
|-
|Hananoumi
|1976-3
|1989-3
|dKomusubi
|Hanaregoma
|Injury prone but briefly a nemesis of Chiyonofuji in the late 1980s
|-
|Ishinriki
|1976-3
|1990-7
|g0Jūryō 1
|Onaruto
|One of the smallest ever sekitori, later went into pro wrestling
|-
|Takamisugi
|1976-3
|1995-11
|dKomusubi
|Futagoyama
|Had record 71 tournaments in top division without winning a special prize
|-
|Kototsubaki
|1976-3
|1995-3
|eMaegashira 3
|Sadogatake
|elder in the JSA under the name Shiratama
|-
|Amanoyama
|1976-3
|1986-11
|eMaegashira 1
|Tokitsukaze
|Died while active as Tatsutayama-oyakata in 1997
|-
|Fujinoshin
|1976-3
|1990-9
|eMaegashira 1
|IzutsuKokonoe
|active as an elder in the JSA under the name Jinmaku
|-
|Dairyū
|1976-5
|1997-7
|g0Jūryō 4
|Taihō
|became head coach of Ōtake stable after Takatōriki was fired by the JSA in July 2010
|-
|Maenoshin
|1977-3
|1990-3
|dKomusubi
|Takadagawa
|became an elder after retirement but was fired in 1997
|-
|Kinoarashi
|1977-3
|1991-9
|eMaegashira 2
|Oshiogawa
|jūryō champion
|-
|Enazakura
|1977-3
|1994-7
|eMaegashira 1
|Oshiogawa
|jūryō champion, former elder in the JSA
|-
|Jingaku
|1977-5
|1991-9
|dKomusubi
|Izutsu
|career restricted by nerves on the dohyo, scored only 2-13 and 3-12 in two attempts at komusubi rank
|-
|Sakahoko
|1978-1
|1992-9
|cSekiwake
|Izutsu
|served in top division at the same time as his brother Terao, a very rare occurrence; record for longest serving sekiwake 
|-
|Asashio IV
|1978-3
|1989-3
|bŌzeki
|Takasago
|director of JSA until February 2008
|-
|Kotoinazuma
|1978-3
|1999-7
|dKomusubi
|Sadogatake
|now coach at the very successful Sadogatake stable
|-
|Mitoizumi
|1978-3
|2000-9
|cSekiwake
|Takasago
|fan favorite known for throwing a huge handful of salt in pre-bout ritual, retired at the late age of 38
|-
|onokuniŌnokuni
|1978-3
|1991-7
|aYokozuna
|HanakagoHanaregoma
|often plagued by injury, also suffered from sleep apnea, published an autobiography in 2008
|-
|Wakasegawa
|1978-3
|1992-7
|eMaegashira 1
|Isegahama
|three-time jūryō champion
|-
|Kirinishiki
|1978-3
|1995-11
|eMaegashira 2
|Kagamiyama
|won three gold stars, active as an elder in the JSA under the name Katsunoura
|-
|Itai
|1978-9
|1991-9
|dKomusubi
|Onaruto
|had the longest winning streak from entry into pro sumo until record broken by Jōkōryū more than 30 years later, after retirement made allegations of match-fixing
|-
|Misugisato
|1979-1
|1998-7
|dKomusubi
|Futagoyama
|promoted to komusubi without ever facing any san'yaku wrestlers
|-
|Futahaguro
|1979-3
|1987-12
|aYokozuna
|Tatsunami
|only yokozuna to have never won a top division championship
|-
|Hokutoumi
|1979-3
|1992-5
|aYokozuna
|Kokonoe
|once one of four yokozuna, after his retirement the rank was vacant for 8 months until Akebono
|-
|Kotogaume
|1979-3
|1997-3
|cSekiwake
|Sadogatake
|last to defeat Chiyonofuji before his 53-win streak
|-
|Masurao
|1979-3
|1990-7
|cSekiwake
|Oshiogawa
|had a record 5 jūryō championships
|-
|Takanofuji
|1979-3
|1992-5
|dKomusubi
|Kokonoe
|stablemate of Chiyonofuji and Hokutoumi, now a professional wrestler
|-
|Terao
|1979-7
|2002-11
|cSekiwake
|Izutsu
|has a long sumo pedigree, holds a number of longevity records
|-
|Tamakirin
|1980-1
|1987-7
||g0Jūryō 6
|Oshiogawa
|quit to become a professional wrestler
|-
|Kotofuji
|1980-3
|1995-9
|cSekiwake
|Sadogatake
|won a tournament championship from the maegashira ranks
|-
|Hidenohana
|1980-3
|1994-3
|g0Jūryō 5
|HanakagoHanaregoma
|former jūryō champion, but never reached the makuuchi division
|-
|Kyokudōzan
|1980-5
|1996-11
|dKomusubi
|Ōshima
|known for light weight, later became a politician
|-
|Asahifuji
|1981-1
|1992-1
|aYokozuna
|Ōshima
|his Isegahama has produced the very successful rikishi Harumafuji and Aminishiki.
|-
|Kasugafuji
|1981-3
|1996-9
||eMaegashira 1
|Kasugayama
|re-established Kasugayama stable, forced to resign from Japan Sumo Association after expenses scandal
|-
|Kotobeppu
|1981-3
|1997-11
|eMaegashira 1
|Sadogatake
|ring name comes from the famous hot spring resort city of Beppu, where he was born
|-
|Tochitsukasa
|1981-3
|1992-5
|cSekiwake
|Kasugano
|now head of Irumagawa stable
|-
|Daizen
|1981-3
|2002-3
|dKomusubi
|Nishonoseki
|Twenty-two-year career, ranked in makuuchi at age 37
|-
|Toyonoumi
|1981-3
|1999-3
|eMaegashira 1
|FutagoyamaFujishimaFutagoyama
|two-time jūryō champion, former elder in the JSA
|-
|Asahisato
|1981-3
|1998-1
|fMaegashira 14
|Ōshima
|spent the majority of his career in the jūryō division, took over former Kasugayama stable
|-
|Kitakachidoki
|1981-5
|2000-9
|eMaegashira 3
||Isenoumi
|steady if unspectacular makuuchi career, now head of Isenoumi stable
|-
|Wakashoyo
|1981-5
|1997-11
|cSekiwake
||Futagoyama
|now a mixed martial artist
|-
|Akinoshima
|1982-3
|2003-5
|cSekiwake
|Futagoyama
|all-time gold stars record holder, 25% more than closest rival
|-
|Tamakairiki
|1982-5
|1996-3
|e0Maegashira 8
|Kataonami
|later became a professional wrestler
|-
|Konishiki
|1982-7
|1997-11
|bŌzeki
|Takasago
|at 265 kilos, the heaviest wrestler ever, first foreign ōzeki, now a widely popular celebrity
|-
|Takatōriki
|1983-3
|2002-9
|cSekiwake
|Futagoyama
|record for most fighting spirit prizes, most gold stars against one opponent, Akebono; won his only top division championship while just above the demotion line
|-
|Hattori
|1983-3
|1987-7
|eMaegashira 3
|Isenoumi
|entered professional sumo as a makushita tsukedashi
|-
|Daigaku
|1983-3
|1993-9
|g0Jūryō 2
|Tokitsukaze
|jūryō champion
|-
|Ryūkōzan
|1983-3
|1990-3
|eMaegashira 5
|Dewanoumi
|jūryō champion, died of heart attack whilst active
|-
|Oginohana
|1983-7
|1998-7
|eMaegashira 2
|Dewanoumi
|now head of Dewanoumi stable
|-
|Ichinoya
|1983-11
|2007-11
|i0Sandanme 6
|Takasago
|studied physics at university, retired at 46
|-
|Komafudō
|1984-1
|1985-11
|fMaegashira 13
|HanakagoHanaregoma
|jūryō champion
|-
|Kotonishiki
|1984-3
|2000-9
|cSekiwake
|Sadogatake
|only wrestler ever to win two championships at maegashira
|-
|Kyokugōzan
|1984-3
|1996-9
|eMaegashira 9
|Ōshima
|jūryō champion
|-
|Daishi
|1984-3
|2002-3
|eMaegashira 3
|Oshiogawa
|had to leave the JSA in June 2003 when he couldn't acquire a permanent elder name
|-
|Minatofuji
|1984-3
|2002-9
|eMaegashira 2
|Minato
|jūryō champion, head coach of Mintao stable
|-
|Kotonowaka
|1984-5
|2005-11
|cSekiwake
|Sadogatake
|known for his countering techniques, and especially long bouts
|-
|Naminohana
|1984-5
|1997-3
|dKomusubi
|Futagoyama
|part of huge sekitori contingent at Futagoyama stable in the mid 1990s
|-
|Nankairyu
|1984-9
|1988-11
|eMaegashira 2
|Takasago
|3rd foreign wrestler to reach the top division, career short and troubled
|-
|Akinoshū
|1984-9
|2001-1
|eMaegashira 9
|Izutsu
|jūryō champion
|-
|Kenkō
|1984-11
|1998-3
|dKomusubi
|Takadagawa
|career ended early by extremely rare form of leukemia
|-
|Ryōgoku
|1985-3
|1993-1
|dKomusubi
|Dewanoumi
|currently head of one of the strongest stables, Sakaigawa
|-
|Tochinowaka
|1985-3
|1999-7
|cSekiwake
|Kasugano
|current head of Kasugano stable
|-
|Tatsuhikari
|1985-3
|1999-3
|eMaegashira 6
|Tatsunami
|two-time jūryō champion
|-
|Tokitsunada
|1985-3
|1999-9
|eMaegashira 4
|Tokitsukaze
|two-time jūryō champion
|-
|Aogiyama
|1985-3
|2003-11
|eMaegashira 1
|Tokitsukaze
|two-time jūryō champion, elder in the JSA under the name Edagawa
|-
|Kanechika
|1985-9
|2004-9
|g0Jūryō 2
|MihogasekiKitanoumi
|elder in the JSA under the name Kumagatani
|-
|Kototenzan
|1985-11
|1986-7
|h4Makushita 43
|Sadogatake
|Canadian-born, found success early, but retired due to inability to adjust to sumo/Japanese life; later became pro wrestler
|-
|Ganyū
|1986-3
|2000-5
|eMaegashira 1
|Kitanoumi
|active as an elder in the JSA under the name Yamahibiki
|-
|Hanakaze
|1986-3
|2021-1
|i1Sandanme 18
|Tatsunami
|longest career in history of sumo, aged 51 at retirement
|-
|Tomoefuji
|1986-5
|1998-9
|dKomusubi
|Kokonoe
|former performer of the yumitori-shiki ceremony, fell to what at the time was lowest rank held by former san'yaku wrestler
|-
|Asahiyutaka
|1987-3
|1999-1
|dKomusubi
|Ōshima
|now head coach of Tatsunami stable
|-
|Kitazakura
|1987-3
|2010-3
|eMaegashira 9
|Kitanoumi
|brother of Toyozakura, took 86 tournaments to reach top division, popular with sumo audiences
|-
|Kotoryū
|1987-3
|2005-5
|eMaegashira 1
|Sadogatake
|one of many top wrestlers at Sadogatake stable in the 1990s
|-
|Oginishiki
|1987-3
|2004-1
|dKomusubi
|Dewanoumi
|his father and brother were also sumo wrestlers
|-
|Takanonami
|1987-3
|2004-5
|bŌzeki
|Futagoyama
|had longest single wrestler rivalry in history with Musashimaru, often appears on television due to accessible personality
|-
|Takamishu
|1987-3
|1989-7
|h0Makushita 2
|Azumazeki
|Early star from Azumazeki stable before being overshadowed by stablemate Akebono. Actor with recurring role in Hawaii Five-0.
|-
|Hoshitango
|1987-5
|2004-1
|g0Jūryō 3
|Michinoku
|first Jew in sumo, now a professional wrestler
|-
|Kushimaumi
|1988-1
|1998-11
|eMaegashira 1
|Dewanoumi
|highly successful amateur, head of Tagonoura stable until death due to heart disease at 46
|-
|Akebono
|1988-3
|2001-1
|aYokozuna
|Azumazeki
|first foreign yokozuna, later became a pro wrestler
|-
|Kaiō
|1988-3
|2011-7
|bŌzeki
|Tomozuna
|five-time yusho winner, holds records for most tournaments and most wins in top division
|-
|Takanohana II
|1988-3
|2003-1
|aYokozuna
|Futagoyama
|long sumo pedigree, set many youth related records, won 22 tournaments
|-
|Wakanohana III
|1988-3
|2000-3
|aYokozuna
|Futagoyama
|brother of Takanohana II, never won a tournament as yokozuna, now operates a chain of chankonabe restaurants
|-
|Wakanoyama
|1988-3
|2005-9
|dKomusubi
|Musashigawa
|after demotion out of top division, fought his way back up after a record long 28 tournaments
|-
|Rikio
|1988-3
|1997-9
|eMaegashira 4
|Naruto
|now a pro wrestler
|-
|Sentōryū
|1988-7
|2003-11
|fMaegashira 12
|Tomozuna
|from St. Louis Missouri, only top division wrestler ever from mainland USA
|-
|Shikishima
|1989-1
|2001-5
|eMaegashira 1
|TatsutagawaMichinoku
|jūryō champion, currently using Aminishiki's Ajigawa kabu
|-
|Kōbō
|1989-3
|2008-1
|eMaegashira 9
|Miyagino
|top wrestler at Miyagino stable before the emergence of Hakuho
|-
|Toyozakura
|1989-3
|2011-5
|eMaegashira 5
|Michinoku
|brother of Kitazakura, forced to retire in match-fixing scandal
|-
|Hidenokuni
|1989-9
|1990-5
|j8Jonidan 89
|Azumazeki
|first and only wrestler from the UK, short career
|-
|Daishōyama
|1989-9
|1995-11
|eMaegashira 2
|Tatsunami
|former amateur champion, retired due to hip injury, currently head coach of Oitekaze stable
|-
|Musashimaru
|1989-9
|2003-11
|aYokozuna
|Musashigawa
|born in Samoa and raised in Hawaii; second foreign yokozuna; injury free until near end of career
|-
|Gojōrō
|1989-11
|2005-11
|eMaegashira 3
|Magaki
|only rikishi to be disqualified twice in one tournament, had many injury problems
|-
|Daishōhō
|1990-1
|1999-7
|dKomusubi
|Tatsunami
|career ended early due to pancreatic cancer
|-
|Terunoumi
|1990-3
|1993-5
|fMaegashira 15
|Musashigawa
|jūryō champion
|-
|Mainoumi
|1990-5
|1999-11
|dKomusubi
|Dewanoumi
|very popular for small size and variety of techniques, now a popular TV personality and sumo announcer
|-
|Yamato
|1990-11
|1998-9
|fMaegashira 12
|Magaki
|after short career in sumo, started his own restaurant in Roppongi, Tokyo
|-
|Tōki
|1991-1
|2006-5
|dKomusubi
|Takasago
|known for distinctive sideburns, and later a bright orange mawashi, involved in an auto accident scandal
|-
|Chiyotenzan
|1991-3
|2008-1
|dKomusubi
|Kokonoe
|after quick rise to komusubi, eventually fell to the second-lowest rank ever held by a former san'yaku wrestler
|-
|Kasuganishiki
|1991-3
|2011-1
|eMaegashira 5
|Kasugano
|injury-plagued, widely accepted as a ring leader in 2011 match-fixing scandal
|-
|Kinkaiyama
|1991-3
|2006-5
|eMaegashira 6
|Dewanoumi
|three-time jūryō champion, now a coach at Dewanoumi stable under the name Tagonoura
|-
|Wakaazuma
|1991-9
|2003-5
|g0Jūryō 13
|Tamanoi
|third brazilian to become a sekitori
|-
|Hamanoshima
|1992-1
|2004-5
|dKomusubi
|Mihogaseki
|now head of Onoe stable
|-
|Higonoumi
|1992-1
|2002-11
|eMaegashira 1
|Mihogaseki
|held maegashira rank for a then-record 53 consecutive tournaments, opened up Kise stable after retirement
|-
|Ohinode
|1992-1
|2000-9
|eMaegashira 9
|Tatsunami
|spent 21 tournaments as a sekitori
|-
|Wakanojō
|1992-1
|2004-5
|eMaegashira 6
|Magaki
|jūryō champion
|-
|Asanowaka
|1992-3
|2005-5
|eMaegashira 1
|WakamatsuTakasago
|the wrestler with the most wins in top division who never made san'yaku, popular with crowds for his ringside antics
|-
|Kyokushūzan
|1992-3
|2006-11
|dKomusubi
|Ōshima
|first of a group of Mongolian wrestlers to make the top division, had an all-time record 58 consecutive tournaments in the maegashira ranks
|-
|Kyokutenhō
|1992-3
|2015-7
|cSekiwake
||Ōshima, Tomozuna
|three-time sekiwake, was last remaining member of first wave of Mongolians to enter sumo, oldest top division championship holder in the history of modern sumo, holds the record for the most top division bouts of all time
|-
|Kyokutenzan
|1992-3
|2007-11
|h1Makushita 13
|Ōshima
|achieved only minor success, suspected of being involved in match-fixing
|-
|Shunketsu
|1992-3
|2008-3
|fMaegashira 12
|Hanaregoma
|lightweight wrestler, had several different ring names
|-
|Takanotsuru
|1992-3
|2006-5
|eMaegashira 8
|Naruto
|spent 10 years in the unsalaried ranks
|-
|Takanowaka
|1992-3
|2007-9
|cSekiwake
|Naruto
|father was a pro baseball player
|-
|Tomonohana
|1992-3
|2001-11
|dKomusubi
|Tatsunami
|joined pro sumo at nearly 28 years of age
|-
|Harunoyama
|1992-3
|2006-11
|fMaegashira 10
|Matsugane
|former elder in the JSA
|-
|Asanosho
|1992-3
|2002-1
|eMaegashira 2
|Wakamatsu
|won a gold star against Akebono
|-
|Wakanosato
|1992-3
|2015-9
|cSekiwake
|Naruto
|seventeen-time sekiwake, makuuchi regular who held record for most consecutive tournaments in junior sanyaku ranks 
|-
|Daimanazuru
|1992-5
|2010-1
|fMaegashira 16
|Asahiyama
|spent 11 years in unsalaried ranks, one of few wrestlers from Nara prefecture
|-
|Ryūkō
|1992-5
|1999-1
|g0Jūryō 8
|Tamanoi
|Brazilian-born, first foreigner to be awarded makushita tsukedashi status
|-
|Chiyotaikai
|1992-11
|2010-1
|bŌzeki
|Kokonoe
|longest serving ōzeki in modern era, known for characteristic forward thrusting technique
|-
|Jūmonji
|1992-11
|2011-5
|eMaegashira 6
|Michinoku
|after a brief name change reverted to using own rare surname as his ring name, forced to retire in match-fixing scandal
|-
|Musōyama
|1993-1
|2004-11
|bŌzeki
|Musashigawa
|former college champion and member of dominant Musashigawa stable, injury-prone
|-
|Tochisakae
|1993-1
|2008-1
|eMaegashira 1
|Kasugano
|also had many injury problems, now a coach at Kasugano stable
|-
|Hokutōriki
|1993-3
|2011-5
|cSekiwake
|Hakkaku
|three-time tournament runner-up, ended Asashoryu's winning streak in 2004
|-
|Kotokasuga
|1993-3
|2011-5
|eMaegashira 7
|Sadogatake
|took 15 years to reach the top division, third-slowest ever, forced to retire in match-fixing scandal
|-
|Kyokunankai
|1993-3
|2011-5
|fMaegashira 16
|Ōshima
|took 17 years to reach the top division, second-slowest ever, forced to retire in match-fixing scandal
|-
|ogaŌga
|1993-3
|2007-5
|g0Jūryō 6
|Takasago
|long serving bow-twirler at end of every tournament day
|-
|otsukasaŌtsukasa
|1993-3
|2009-3
|eMaegashira 4
|Irumagawa
|promoted to the top division on 11 different occasions
|-
|Ryūhō
|1993-3
|2012-5
|fMaegashira 16
|Michinoku
|spent 9 years in unsalaried ranks, sat out last year in sumo before finally retiring
|-
|Wakatoba
|1993-3
|2007-9
|fMaegashira 11
|Oguruma
|coached by former Daikirin, now has his elder name, Oshiogawa
|-
|Towanoyama
|1993-a11
|2015-1
|e1Maegashira 13
|Dewanoumi
|best-rank maegashira 13, yet through unlucky twist of fate never had a makuuchi bout
|-
|Asōfuji
|1994-1
|2011-5
|fMaegashira 13
|Isegahama
|very adept at throw techniques, brother of Aminishiki
|-
|Tamakasuga
|1994-1
|2008-9
|cSekiwake
|Kataonami
|had the longest ever gap between sanshō awards at 55 tournaments, has an asteroid named after him
|-
|Tosanoumi
|1994-3
|2011-1
|cSekiwake
|Isenoumi
|impressive special prize and gold star record, fought until age 38
|-
|Ushiomaru
|1994-3
|2009-5
|fMaegashira 10
|Azumazeki
|retired to take over as head coach of Azumazeki stable from former Takamiyama
|-
|Tochiazuma II
|1994-11
|2007-5
|bŌzeki
|Tamanoi
|won 12 special prizes, seven for technique, first wrestler since Kiyokuni to win top division in ōzeki debut
|-
|Tochinohana
|1995-3
|2008-1
|dKomusubi
|Kasugano
|Won two special prizes in his debut top division tournament
|-
|oikariŌikari
|1995-2
|2004-11
|fMaegashira 11
|Isenoumi
|two-time jūryō champion, elder in the JSA under the name Kabutoyama
|-
|Wakatsutomu
|1995-11
|2006-7
|fMaegashira 12
|Matsugane
|jūryō champion
|-
|Kaihō
|1996-1
|2010-7
|dKomusubi
|Hakkaku
|also an amateur champion, one of the lightest sekitori
|-
|Tochinonada
|1996-1
|2012-1
|cSekiwake
|Kasugano
|former sekiwake, tied for second on all-time kinboshi list
|-
|Yōtsukasa
|1996-1
|2005-11
|fMaegashira 11
|Irumagawa
|managed only two winning records in eight makuuchi appearances
|-
|Tokitsuumi
|1996-3
|2007-10
|eMaegashira 3
|Tokitsukaze
|former amateur, long time maegashira, retired to take over Tokitsukaze stable after former head removed over hazing death scandal
|-
|Dejima
|1996-3
|2009-7
|bŌzeki
|Musashigawa
|ōzeki from 1999 to 2001, once had the most feared tachi-ai in sumo but suffered injury problems in later career
|-
|Aminishiki
|1997-1
|2019-7
|cSekiwake
|Isegahama
|former sekiwake, all-time top ten for a number of sumo records, including most top division wins, most top division appearances and most tournaments ranked in the top division.
|-
|Buyūzan
|1997-3
|2007-11
|eMaegashira 1
|Musashigawa
|former amateur champion, another top division wrestler from Musashigawa stable
|-
|Tamarikidō
|1997-3
|2010-1
|eMaegashira 8
|Kataonami
|lowest-ranking former top division wrestler ever to regain sekitori status
|-
|Hayateumi
|1998-3
|2006-1
|cSekiwake
|Oitekaze
|former amateur champion, very promising career hampered and eventually ended by injury
|-
|Kaidō
|1998-3
|2006-9
|g0Jūryō 4
|Tomozuna
|another former amateur but failed to make top division, stablemate of ozeki Kaiō
|-
|Kitataiki
|1998-3
|2018-1
|eMaegashira 2
|Yamahibiki
|best rank maegashira 2, held record for most consecutive bouts by an active wrestler at the end of his career
|-
|Tamaasuka
|1998-3
|2016-9
|g0Maegashira 9
|Kataonami
|two-time jūryō winner, has been promoted to makuuchi 7 times
|-
|Tamanoshima
|1998-3
|2011-11
|cSekiwake
|Kataonami
|was the only Fukushima prefecture native sekitori for a number of years
|-
|Miyabiyama
|1998-7
|2013-3
|bŌzeki
|Fujishima
|promotion to ōzeki controversial, rose to top division so fast that he competed in his first top division tournaments with no top-knot, long-time makuuchi pusher thruster
|-
|Kasugaō
|1998-11
|2011-5
|eMaegashira 3
|Kasugayama
|only wrestler officially from Korean peninsula, forced to retired in match-fixing scandal
|-
|Asashōryū
|1999-1
|2010-1
|aYokozuna
|Takasago
|sole yokozuna from 2004–07, 4th-most top division championships in history, life in and out of ring filled with controversy
|-
|Bushūyama
|1999-1
|2013-1
|eMaegashira 3
|Fujishima
|second-slowest progress to top division for any former collegiate champ
|-
|Chiyohakuhō
|1999-3
|2011-5
|eMaegashira 6
|Kokonoe
|originally interested in judo, debuted the same tournament his former stablemate Chiyotaikai made Ōzeki, retired over match-fixing
|-
|Hamanishiki
|1999-3
|2012-3
|fMaegashira 11
|Oitekaze
|former maegashira 11, struggled in lower divisions, changed his ring name a number of times
|-
|Hananosato
|1999-3
|2010-5
|h0Makushita 8
|Takasago
|former tsukebito of Asashoryu, once reached the cusp of sekitori but at 114 kg seemed to lack the requisite weight
|-
|Kirinowaka
|1999-3
|2011-5
|g0Jūryō 4
|Michinoku
|was forced to retire due to his involvement in the 2011 match-fixing scandal
|-
|Kotomitsuki
|1999-3
|2010-7
|bŌzeki
|Sadogatake
|holds record for most tournaments at sekiwake, oldest wrestler promoted to ōzeki in modern era, forced to retire due to illegal gambling
|-
|Takamisakari
|1999-3
|2013-1
|dKomusubi
|Azumazeki
|very popular with crowds for his energetic wrestling and spirited pre-bout ritual
|-
|Wakakirin
|1999-3
|2009-2
|eMaegashira 9
|Oguruma
|Protege of former ozeki Daikirin, dismissed for cannabis use
|-
|Wakakōyū
|1999-3
|2014-9
|dKomusubi
|Onomatsu
|best-rank komusubi, second wrestler from Onomatsu stable to reach top division after Katayama
|-
|Hakuba
|2000-1
|2011-5
|dKomusubi
|Michinoku
|fifty-tournament rise to top division is 2nd-longest after Sentoryu amongst foreign-born wrestlers, forced to retire in match-fixing scandal
|-
|Asasekiryū
|2000-3
|2017-5
|cSekiwake
|Takasago
|two time sekiwake, father held equivalent of komusubi in Mongolian wrestling
|-
|Hōchiyama
|2000-3
|2014-1
|e1Maegashira 14
|Sakaigawa
|after soaring through jūryō into top division, was soon demoted and struggled in lower divisions
|-
|Ōrora
|2000–3
|2018-9
|e1Makushita 43
|Yamahibiki
|first Russian to join professional sumo, became heaviest sumo wrestler ever
|-
|Ryūō
|2000-3
|2013-7
|e0Maegashira 8
|Miyagino
|specialized in pushing techniques which is a rarity among Mongolian wrestlers
|-
|Shimotori
|2000-5
|2011-5
|dKomusubi
|Tokitsukaze
|used own rare family name as his shikona, forced to retire in match-fixing scandal
|-
|Iwakiyama
|2000-7
|2010-9
|dKomusubi
|Sakaigawa
|former high school sumo coach, retired due to cerebral infarction complications
|-
|Kōryū
|2000-11
|2011-5
|fMaegashira 11
|Hanakago
|first top division wrestler produced by Hanakago stable since it was re-established in 1992, forced to retire in match-fixing scandal
|-
|Harumafuji
|2001-1
|2017-11
|aYokozuna
|Isegahama
|Third Mongolian yokozuna, won nine tournament championships, retired after alleged assault on fellow wrestler Takanoiwa
|-
|Aotsurugi
|2001-3
|2009-5
|i0Sandanme 1
|Tagonoura
|Originally from Tonga, acquired Japanese citizenship, missed a year through injury
|-
|Hakuhō
|2001-3
|2021-9
|aYokozuna
|Miyagino
|holds the records for most top division championships, most career wins, and most wins in a calendar year at 86
|-
|Mōkonami
|2001-3
|2011-5
|eMaegashira 6
|Tatsunami
|first from Tatsunami stable to be ranked in makuuchi since 1999, forced to retire in match-fixing scandal
|-
|Shōtenrō
|2001-3
|2018-1
|eMaegashira 2
|Fujishima
|best rank maegashira 2, former junior wrestling champion at Mongolian Naadam festival
|-
|Kokkai
|2001-5
|2012-9
|dKomusubi
|Oitekaze
|former komusubi, first Caucasian wrestler to make top division, shikona came from Japanese name of the Black Sea of his home country 
|-
|Daishochi
|2001-7
|2005-9
|h1Makushita 15
|Shibatayama
|Mongolian now better known as amateur sumo champion
|-
|Kakizoe
|2001-9
|2012-5
|dKomusubi
|Fujishima
|used own rare surname as his shikona
|-
|Takanoyama
|2001-a11
|2014-7
|e1Maegashira 12
|Tagonoura
|only wrestler ever from the Czech Republic
|-
|Kakuryū
|2001-a11
|2021-3
|aYokozuna
|IzutsuMichinoku
|fourth Mongolian yokozuna, six makuuchi championships
|-
|Toyonoshima
|2002-1
|2020-5
|cSekiwake
|Tokitsukaze
|five-time runner-up, one of the shortest sekitori
|-
|Kotoshōgiku
|2002-1
|2020-11
|bOzeki
|Sadogatake
|In January 2016 he became the first Japanese-born wrestler in ten years to win a top-division tournament.
|-
|Kisenosato
|2002-3
|2019-1
|aYokozuna
|Tagonoura
|won two championships, in 2017 as first Japanese to be named yokozuna in almost 20 years he suffered a severe muscle tear winning his debut tournament and never fully recovered
|-
|Katayama
|2002-3
|2009-1
|fMaegashira 13
|Onomatsu
|did amateur sumo at university, used his given family name as his ring name.
|-
|Hakurozan
|2002-5
|2008-9
|eMaegashira 2
|Kitanoumi
|along with older brother Rohō, became first foreign siblings to wrestle in top division at the same time, later dismissed due to cannabis use
|-
|Rohō
|2002-5
|2008-9
|dKomusubi
|Ōtake
|known for feisty nature, along with younger brother Hakurozan, was dismissed due to cannabis use
|-
|Amūru
|2002-5
|2018-5
|eMaegashira 5
|Ōnomatsu
|last Russian sekitori, injury-plagued career
|-
|Takekaze
|2002-5
|2019-1
|cSekiwake
|Oguruma
|jūryō champion, the oldest sekiwake debutant since the end of World War II at the age of 35 years two months, and holds record for longest time from makuuchi debut to sekiwake at 64 basho
|-
|Tokitenkū
|2002-7
|2016-11
|dKomusubi
|Tokitsukaze
|two-time jūryō champ, won three consecutive championships from his debut
|-
|Kotoōshū
|2002-a11
|2014-3
|c1Ōzeki
|Sadogatake
|lost ōzeki status after 8 straight years at that rank, first European to win a top division championship, now founder and head coach of Naruto stable
|-
|Arawashi
|2002-a11
|2020-1
|eMaegashira 2
|Minezaki
|took over 11 years to reach makuuchi, last survivor from Araiso stable
|-
|Futen'ō
|2003-1
|2011-5
|dKomusubi
|Dewanoumi
|collegiate sumo champ, sumo lover from very early age
|-
|Masatsukasa
|2003-1
|2011-5
|eMaegashira 8
|Irumagawa
|on promotion to sekitori ranks revealed to public he had a wife and son back home in Aomori Prefecture, forced to retire in match-fixing scandal
|-
|Sadanofuji
|2003-3
|2017-5
|e0Maegashira 7
|Sakaigawa
|once released as Iwakiyama's tsukebito so he could concentrate on his wrestling
|-
|Tokusegawa
|2003-7
|2011-5
|eMaegashira 4
|Kiriyama
|first wrestler from his stable to make top division, forced to retire in match-fixing scandal
|-
|Sōkokurai
|2003-9
|2020-3
| eMaegashira 2
|Arashio
|was expelled from sumo in 2011 due to alleged match-fixing but reinstated after winning a court case, became Arashio oyakata
|-
|Yoshikaze
|2004-1
|2019-9
|cSekiwake
|Oguruma
|four-time sekiwake, college sumo champion, at one time held record for most makuuchi appearances without a san'yaku promotion
|- 
|Hōmashō
|2004-3
|2015-1
|dKomusubi
|Shikoroyama
|three-time komusubi, first wrestler to make top division from former sekiwake Terao's stable
|-
|Kimurayama
|2004-3
|2014-1
|e0Maegashira 7
|Kasugano
|one-time amateur champion, only sekitori from Wakayama prefecture for some time
|-
|Satoyama
|2004-3
|2018-11
|fMaegashira 12
|Onoe
|known for using a wide variety of techniques, used own rare surname as his ring name.
|-
|Baruto
|2004-5
|2013-9
|bŌzeki
|Onoe
|Estonian, tied for 3rd-fastest rise to top division, second European to win a championship
|-
|Gōeidō
|2005-1
|2020-1
|bŌzeki
|Sakaigawa
|held rank of sekiwake for a modern record 14 consecutive tournaments, one-time makuuchi champion
|-
|Tochiōzan
|2005-1
|2020-7
|cSekiwake
|Kasugano
|longtime rival of Gōeidō
|-
|Toyohibiki
|2005-1
|2021-7
|e0Maegashira 2
|Sakaigawa
|On rise to top division, suffered only one make-koshi. Once held active record for most makuuchi appearances without a san'yaku promotion
|-
|Sagatsukasa
|2005-1
|2021-9
|eMaegashira 9
|Irumagawa
|High school yokozuna, one of the shortest recent sekitori
|-
|Okinoumi
|2005-1
|2023-1
|cSekiwake
|Hakkaku
|one of the few top wrestlers from Shimane Prefecture, a three time runner-up
|-
|Asahishō
|2005-3
|2021-7
|e1Maegashira 11
|Tomozuna
|Was one of wrestlers who briefly took up Mitoizumi's trademark salt-throwing routine
|-
|Daidō
|2005-3
|2016-1
|g0Maegashira 8
|Onomatsu
|former amateur wrestler at Senshu University
|-
|Ikioi
|2005-3
|2021-7
||cSekiwake
|Isenoumi
|had 1090 consecutive career matches
|-
|Wakanohō
|2005-3
|2008-8
|eMaegashira 1
|Magaki
|a fast-rising star, one of the most successful Russian wrestlers, first active wrestler to be dismissed by the Sumo Association (after arrest for cannabis possession)
|-
|Seirō
|2005-7
|2020-7
|e1Maegashira 14
|Shikoroyama
|Mongolian wrestler first spotted by then-yokozuna Asashōryū in his younger years
|-
|Sakaizawa
|2006-3
|2011-5
|e15Maegashira 15
|MihogasekiOnoe
|jūryō champion, was forced to retire due to his involvement in the 2011 match-fixing scandal
|-
|Shōhōzan
|2006-3
|2022-6
|dKomusubi
|MatsuganeNishonosekiHanaregoma
|five-time komusubi, returned from two tournament suspension for baseball gambling in 2010 to become makushita mainstay
|-
|Masunoyama
|2006-7
|2021-5
|e4Maegashira 4
|Chiganoura
|first wrestler from his stable to make top division, but injuries and other health issues eventually led him to retire
|-
|Kaisei
|2006-9
|2022-9
|Sekiwake
|TomozunaŌshima
|first brazilian to reach makuuchi and sanyaku, now a coach at Ōshima stable under the name Tomozuna
|-
|Aran
|2007-1
|2013-9
|cSekiwake
|Mihogaseki
|former sekiwake, one of a handful of Russian sekitori, shares the place record for fastest rise to top division, after Jōkōryū
|-
|Kiyoseumi
|2007-1
|2011-5
|e1Maegashira 13
|Kitanoumi
|pro sumo debut at Makushita #10 was the highest Makushita tsukedashi ever, forced to retire in bout-fixing scandal
|-
|Tochinowaka
|2007-1
|2015-1
|e1Maegashira 1
|Kasugano
|had Korean background but Japanese citizenship, used his stablemaster's old shikona
|-
|Yamamotoyama
|2007-1
|2011-5
|e1Maegashira 9
|Onoe
|heaviest sumo recruit ever at time of recruitment, forced to retire in match-fixing scandal
|-
|Tenkaihō
|2007-1
|2019-3
||e1Maegashira 8
|Onoe
|one of many Nihon University alumni from his stable
|-
|Tosayutaka
|2007-3
|2016-1
|e0Maegashira 1
|Tokitsukaze
|first wrestler from his stable to reach the top division after the Tokitsukaze stable hazing scandal, injury-plagued career
|-
|Kyokushūhō
|2007-5
|2022-1
|e0Maegashira 4
|Tomozuna
|long time jūryō, joined stable of his idol, fellow countryman Kyokutenhō
|-
|Homarefuji
|2008-1
|2019-9
|e0Maegashira 6
|Isegahama
|from the same town as Mainoumi and the same high school as Masatsukasa
|-
|Kotoyūki
|2008-3
|2021-4
|cSekiwake
|Sadogatake
|one-time sekiwake, jūryō champion, first Kagawa native to reach makuuchi since 1958
|-
|Chiyoōtori
|2008-5
|2021-11
|dKomusubi
|Kokonoe
|had one tournament at komusubi rank, younger brother of Chiyomaru
|-
|Kimikaze
|2009-1
|2014-5
|e1Maegashira 13
|Oguruma
|jūryō champion
|-
|Takanoiwa
|2009-1
|2018-12
|e1Maegashira 2
|TakanohanaChiganoura
|jūryō champion; a year after his alleged assault by Harumafuji led to the Yokozuna's forced retirement, he himself allegedly assaulted one of his attendants and retired
|-
|Jōkōryū
|2011-5
|2022-9
|Komusubi
|KitanoumiKise
|has the fastest rise to the top division in history, only taking him 9 tournaments. He also holds the record for most consecutive wins from entry into sumo.
|-
|Chiyotairyū 
|2011-5
|2022-11
|dKomusubi
|Kokonoe
|former amateur champion, reached the makuuchi division in one year.
|-
|Osunaarashi
|2012-5
|2018-3
|e1Maegashira 1
|Otake
|first African sekitori, forced to retire after being involved in a traffic accident while driving without a license
|-
|Takanofuji
|2013-3
|2019-10
|f0Jūryō 5
|TakanohanaChiganoura
|identical twin of Takagenji, forced to retire after his second instance of allegedly assaulting his attendants
|-
|Takagenji
|2013-3
|2021-9
|fMaegashira 10
|TakanohanaChiganoura
|identical twin of Takanofuji, dismissed from sumo after admitting to smoking cannabis
|-
|Shōnanzakura
|2015-9
|2021-9
|k3Jonokuchi 9
|Shikihide
|better known as Hattorizakura, had a record 104 consecutive losses
|-
|Yutakayama
|2016-3
|2022-11
|e1Maegashira 1
|Tokitsukaze
|former amateur, one of three at his stable who have used this shikona
|-
|Wakaichirō
|2016-11
|2020-2
|i3Sandanme 32
|Musashigawa
|African-American-Japanese, most recent American-born wrestler in sumo
|-
|}

See also
List of active sumo wrestlers
List of heaviest sumo wrestlers
List of non-Japanese sumo wrestlers
List of sumo elders
List of sumo record holders
List of sumo tournament top-division champions
List of sumo tournament second-division champions
List of sumo stables
List of yokozuna
Glossary of sumo terms

Lists of sumo wrestlers